The taekwondo competition at the 2014 Pan American Sports Festival was held in Puebla, Mexico.

Medal summary

Men

Women

References

External links
 Official website

2014 Pan American Sports Festival
Pan American Sports Festival
Pan American Sports Festival